Terrell McNeal, professionally known as MP808, is an American record producer and songwriter. He is best known for his production as part of the American record production group 808 Mafia, as well as artists Meek Mill, Future and Chief Keef.

Career
MP808 would meet American record producer Southside, who would eventually give him a spot on his production group, 808 Mafia. For the next few years, MP808 would work closely with fellow 808 Mafia record producer TM88.

Production credits

2014

Migos - Trouble (Single)
01. "Trouble (feat. T.I.)" 

31 - Scale Tales
02. "Shit"

2015

Chief Keef - Finally Rollin 2
19. "K" 

French Montana - Casino Life 2: Brown Bag Legend
07. "5 Mo (feat. Travis Scott & Lil Durk)" 

Future - EVOL
07. "Seven Rings" 

Lil Uzi Vert - Luv is Rage
05. "Yamborghini Dream (feat. Young Thug)"

2016

Meek Mill - DC4
01. "On The Regular (Intro)" 

T.I. - Us or Else: Letter to the System
03. "Black Man (feat. Quavo, Meek Mill and Ra Ra)"

2017

Meek Mill - Wins & Losses
03. "Fuck That Check Up (feat. Lil Uzi Vert)"

2018
Rae Sremmurd – SR3MM
08. "Rock n Roll Hall of Fame" 
YG – Stay Dangerous
03. "Handgun (feat A$AP Rocky)"

See also
 808 Mafia
 EVOL

References

Living people
American record producers
Year of birth missing (living people)
African-American record producers
21st-century African-American people